Sosibius (lived 3rd century BC) was the chief minister of Ptolemy Philopator (221–204 BC), king of Egypt. Nothing is known of his origin or parentage, though he may have been a son of Sosibius of Tarentum; nor have we any account of the means by which he rose to power; but we find him immediately after the accession of Ptolemy (221 BC), exercising the greatest influence over the young king, and virtually holding the chief direction of affairs. He soon proved himself, as he is termed by Polybius, a ready and dexterous instrument of autocracy: it was by his ministration, if not at his instigation, that Ptolemy put to death in succession his uncle Lysimachus, his brother Magas, and his mother Berenice. Not long after, Cleomenes, of whose influence with the mercenary troops Sosibius had at this time dexterously availed himself, shared the same fate.

While the young king gave himself up to luxury and debauchery, the whole administration of the kingdom appears to have been left to Sosibius, who allowed both the finances and military defences to fall into a state of the greatest decay, so that when Antiochus the Great declared war against Ptolemy, and invaded Coele-Syria, it was some time before the Egyptian monarch or his ministers could muster an army to oppose him. Sosibius, however, displayed some dexterity in delaying the progress of Antiochus by negotiation until he had time to organise a mercenary force: and when, in 218 BC, Ptolemy at length took the field in person, Sosibius accompanied him, and was present at the decisive battle of Raphia. After the close of the campaign he found a more congenial occupation in negotiating the terms of the treaty of peace, which Ptolemy commissioned him to arrange with Antiochus.

During the remainder of the reign of Ptolemy, Sosibius seems to have retained his power, without opposition, though sharing it in some degree with the infamous Agathocles, but we have very little information with regard to the latter years of his rule. We are told, however, that he was once more the minister of Ptolemy in putting to death his wife and sister Arsinoë, as he had previously been in the murder of his other relations. But great as was the address of Sosibius in all the arts and intrigues of a courtier, he was no match for his colleague Agathocles; and although, after the death of Ptolemy Philopator (204 BC), the two ministers at first assumed in conjunction the guardianship of the young king, Ptolemy Epiphanes (204–181 BC), Sosibius seems to have been soon supplanted and put to death by his insidious rival. All particulars of these events are, however, lost to us.

References
Bevan, Edwyn R.; The House of Ptolemy, London, (1927), chapter 7
Polybius; Histories, Evelyn S. Shuckburgh (translator); London - New York, (1889)
Smith, William (editor); Dictionary of Greek and Roman Biography and Mythology, "Sosibius (2)", Boston, (1867)

Notes

3rd-century BC Egyptian people
3rd-century BC Greek people
Ptolemaic regents